5th Projekt are a cinematic rock ensemble from Toronto, Ontario, formed in 2003. Primary songwriters and composers are Tara Rice (vocals & guitars), and Sködt D. McNalty (guitars & vocals). Jeremy Oram (drums) and Jean-François Kardinal (bass) joined the band in 2010.

The band has released 4 EPs, 2 full-length albums and is known for their unique 'cinematic' sound, strong songwriting, poetic lyrics, Rice's haunting vocals, and McNalty's textural guitar work.

History

Organik Rekords, DEMOn001 & DEMOn002 (2004)
McNalty auditioned musicians and vocalists for six months before Tara Rice responded to an on-line advertisement listing an eclectic array of musical influences.

In 2004, they formed the independent label Organik Rekords to release 5th Projekt's first EP DEMOn001. The album was self-produced and recorded by Mark Mclay (Headstones, Jeff Healey, Ronnie Hawkins) at Velvet Sound, in Mississauga, Ontario. National radio support of DEMOn001 and DEMOn002 on Canadian college stations and CBC Radio included a feature on CBC DJ Sook-Yin Lee's Definitely Not the Opera. DEMOn001 made the list of CJLO FM (Quebec) Music Director Omar Husain's Top 10 EPs of 2004. Husain is also credited for calling 5th Projekt's sound "cinematic." The duet "Skepticosm" from DEMOn001 made John Sakamoto's Anti-Hit List in Toronto's Eye Weekly. Both DEMOn001 & DEMOn002 were handmade, packaged in recyclable cardstock and limited to a run of 200 each.

The Tales of Don Quixote (2005)

A limited edition extended EP of demos entitled The Tales of Don Quixote (tToDQ) was released on May 5, 2005, 400 years after Miguel de Cervantes' classic was published. TToDQ was well received by underground press throughout Canada for its creativity, independence & thematic conceptual approach.

TToDQ appeared on Canadian college radio charts throughout the summer and autumn of 2005, garnered a nomination for Best Alternative Artist from the 2005 Toronto Independent Music Awards and invitations to play at the 2005 North by Northeast festival, the 2005 ROCKRGRL Music Conference in Seattle and the 2006 Canadian Music Week festival. The album's handmade packaging was noted as well; it featured a removable dust jacket, illustrated cover and inlaid Buddhist prayer, all printed on recyclable cardstock and papers and limited to a run of 700.

Circadian (2006-2007)
On August 29, 2006, the band released its first full-length studio album, Circadian, which explores the metaphysical relationship of humanity as it coexists with its environment and the cycles in which both partake and create.  Music and lyrics were written by Tara Rice and/or Sködt D. McNalty. Circadian was recorded from May–November 2005 at Toronto's Chemical Sound with James Heidebrecht, produced by Tara Rice and Sködt D. McNalty, mixed by Ken Andrews (formerly of the band Failure) and mastered by João Carvalho.

Circadian received extremely positive reviews from underground press in North America.  Lucid Forge gave Circadian a 4.5/5 rating. The album also received international press, including a 4 star review in Belgium's Keys and Chords Magazine. The album's unique limited edition packaging was a recyclable circular tin with a circular booklet.

Circadian debuted on Toronto's CIUT 89.5 FM at no. 5. The album received support from a number of Canadian university stations, resulting in a No. 93 charting on Canada's !earshot Top 200.

Circadian received nominations for Best Indie Band at the 2007 Ontario Independent Music Awards, Best Rock Song 2007 for 'In a Coma' by Toronto Exclusive Magazine, Best International Artist at the 2007 Orange County Music Awards in California, Best Alternative Artist from the 2006 Toronto Independent Music Awards, a feature on CBC television's 'Sounds Like Summer' music series 2006, and an invitation to play at Indie Week Toronto 2006. The song "Distraktid" was nominated for Best Modern Rock Song at the Just Plain Folks Music Awards in California 2006. Three weeks before the album's release, the song "In a Coma..." was featured on John Sakamoto's Anti-Hit List in The Toronto Star.  The band was also invited to play Project Potter, a release party for the final installation of the Harry Potter book series, held in Toronto at historic Casa Loma on July 20, 2007.

In the Spring of 2007, the video for the album's single "Broken Like This" placed in the Top 10 of the Universal Music Canada & Yahoo! Canada Up Your Music video contest. The song "Resistance" was featured on HOPE Volume One, a compilation CD with proceeds benefiting Suicide Awareness Voices of Education (SAVE).

Hiatus (2008-2009)
5th Projekt went on hiatus during 2008–09 while Rice and McNalty contributed to Toronto band Night Flowers and Los Angeles-based digital music collective LADNA started by Ken Andrews. The band played only two shows during these years; a short film screening of "Broken Tulips" by Brandon Cronenberg on August 8, 2008 and the Music for Multiple Sclerosis Fundraiser on June 11, 2009. Both shows were held at the El Mocambo in Toronto.

V (2010-2011)
In 2010, 5th Projekt began performing new material to live audiences in Ontario and Quebec, including an Earth Day Festival in Montreal, a showcase at Indie Week Toronto 2010, and a performance at the Dia de los Muertos Festival of the Arts in Toronto. Recording of a new album took place from October–December 2010 at Chemical Sound in Toronto. V was produced by Tara Rice and Sködt McNalty, engineered by Dean Marino and Jay Sadlowski, mixed by Dean Marino, and mastered by Noah Mintz.

Gamma-Wave Rhythm (2012-2014)
On September 14, 2013, its 10-year anniversary, 5th Projekt released the EP Gamma-Wave Rhythm. The album was produced, engineered, written, and performed by Tara Rice and Sködt McNalty, mixed by Dean Marino, and mastered by João Carvalho.

Influences
Rice and McNalty cite their parents, who are avid fans of various forms of music, or musicians themselves, as their influences. Nature and her elements have also been listed as an integral influence to 5th Projekt. The band have also named Pink Floyd, Led Zeppelin, Rachel's, Thom Yorke, Secret Chiefs 3, Black Rebel Motorcycle Club, Gordon Lightfoot, Nine Inch Nails, Beck, The Shipping News, A Perfect Circle, Matmos, Oscar Peterson, Three Fish, The Cardigans, Pearl Jam, Godspeed You! Black Emperor, Primus, Radiohead, Björk, Sunny Day Real Estate, Jeremy Enigk, Mogwai, Failure, Ken Andrews, INXS, Tool, Tori Amos, The Ditty Bops, Deftones, Radius & Helena, Jesca Hoop, The Rolling Stones, The Beatles, Merle Haggard and Johnny Cash as influences.

Lyrics & Themes
Rice and McNalty cite metaphysical, esoteric and spiritual imagery in their song writing. "In a Coma..." was inspired by Russian author Yevgeny Zamyatin's 1924 novel We, a precursor to such dystopian classics as Brave New World and Nineteen Eighty-Four. Although "One to Throw Away" contains the lyric "the path to love" it was written before Rice was exposed to the book by Deepak Chopra.

Discography

Studio albums
CiRCADiAN, (August 29, 2006), Organik Rekords
V, (August 9, 2011), Organik Rekords

Singles and EPs
DEMOn001 (EP), (September 14, 2004), Organik Rekords
DEMOn002 (EP), (November 11, 2004), Organik Rekords
The Tales of Don Quixote (Extended EP), (May 5, 2005), Organik Rekords
Gamma-Wave Rhythm (EP), (September 14, 2013), Organik Rekords
Dark Crystal (single) (2020)

Films & Soundtracks
Good People, Bad Things (Opine Entertainment) (October 11, 2008). The tracks TV and Feel, produced, recorded and performed at Organik Studios by Tara Rice and Sködt D. McNalty, appear in both the film and on the soundtrack album.

Compilations
Hope, Volume One (Visionary Concepts) (June 23, 2008) - contains the track Resistance

Videos
In the spring of 2007, the video for the song "Broken Like This" from the album Circadian was entered in the Universal Music Canada & Yahoo! Canada Up Your music video contest where it placed in the Top 10.

Recognition 
Nominations
 2007 Ontario Independent Music Awards, Best Indie - Broken Like This
 2007 Toronto Exclusive Magazine Awards Best Rock - In a Coma...
 2007 Orange County Music Awards Best International
 2006 Just Plain Folks Awards Best Alternative - Distraktid
 2006 Toronto Independent Music Awards Best Alternative
 2005 Toronto Independent Music Awards Best Alternative

See also

Music of Canada
List of bands from Canada
Canadian rock

References

External links
5th Projekt

Musical groups established in 2003
Canadian indie rock groups
Canadian progressive rock groups
Musical groups from Toronto
2003 establishments in Ontario